is an interchange passenger railway station located in the city of Fuchū, Tokyo, Japan, operated jointly by the East Japan Railway Company (JR East) and the private railway operator Keio Corporation.

Lines
Bubaigawara Station is served by the Nambu Line, and is 28.8 kilometers from the Nambu Line terminus at Kawasaki Station.  It is also served by the Keiō Line, and is 23.1 km from the Keio Line Tokyo terminus at Shinjuku.

Station layout
The JR East and Keio Stations each have two side platforms serving two tracks. The two parts of the station share a common station building and entrance, with both JR and Keio ticket vending machines located side by side.

JR East platforms
The JR East platforms are located at ground level, running west to east.

Keio platforms
The Keio platforms are elevated and run approximately north to south.

History
It was renamed to its present name on 11 December 1928. The JNR (now JR East) station also opened on 11 December 1928.

Passenger statistics
In fiscal 2019, the JR station was used by an average of 41,240 passengers daily (boarding passengers only). During the same period, the Keio station was used by an average of 95,121 passengers daily.

The passenger figures (boarding passengers only) for previous years are as shown below.

Surrounding area
MINANO (shopping center)
Toshiba Fuchu Office
Toshiba Digital Solutions
 Fuchu Katamachi Post Office

See also
 List of railway stations in Japan

References

External links

 JR East station information 
 Keio station information 

Railway stations in Japan opened in 1925
Stations of East Japan Railway Company
Nambu Line
Railway stations in Tokyo
Keio Line
Stations of Keio Corporation
Fuchū, Tokyo